Norman Henry Hall (28 November 1894 – 19 November 1974) was an Australian rules footballer who played with Essendon in the Victorian Football League (VFL).

Hall, a forward, was a nephew of Test cricketer and VFL coach Jack Worrall.

Recruited from Melbourne Grammar, Hall made one appearance for Essendon in 1913 and two in 1914, before being cleared to Collegians.

In 1918 he returned to Essendon and kicked 15 goals that year, to top the club's goal-kicking.

References

External links
 
 

1894 births
Australian rules footballers from Victoria (Australia)
Essendon Football Club players
Collegians Football Club players
1974 deaths